The Makotuku River is a river of the west of New Zealand's North Island. It flows southwest from Tūroa ski field, on the slopes of Mount Ruapehu, and passes through the town of Raetihi before its confluence with the Mangawhero River. It has been affected by several lahars over the last 160,000 years.

The New Zealand Ministry for Culture and Heritage gives a translation of "white heron stream" for Mākōtuku.

Water quality 
The long term e. coli rating for the river at Raetihi is poor.

Water supply 
Raetihi's drinking water comes from the river. In 2018 Veolia added activated carbon dosing, coagulation, flocculation, a lamella settler, filters and UV disinfection to the previous two settling ponds and chlorination, to minimise the effect of future pollution events.

Oil spills 
The 2013 leak required Raetihi to have 21 days of water supply from road tankers. The leaks had impacts on mayflies, lichens, mosses, fish and whio. Ruapehu Alpine Lifts Ltd was fined $300,000 for the 2013 spill.

Hydro electricity 
Its water comes from the Makotuku River, Makara Stream, Makaraiti Stream and a tributary of Mangaone Stream. The original generator remains in use.

Makotuku River Walkway 

The  Makotuku River Walkway was upgraded in 2021, with loop tracks on the east side of Raetihi. Much of the funding for the work came from the compensation paid after the 2013 oil spill.

See also
List of rivers of New Zealand

References

External links

Rivers of Manawatū-Whanganui
Rivers of New Zealand